James Cawley (born June 22, 1969) is an American politician who served as the 32nd lieutenant governor of Pennsylvania from 2011 to 2015. A Republican, he previously served on the Board of Commissioners of Bucks County, Pennsylvania.

Early life, education, and early political career
He graduated from Bishop Egan High School in Bristol Township, Bucks County, Pennsylvania. He then graduated cum laude from Temple University with a Bachelor of Arts in Political Science. He received a J.D. degree from Temple University School of Law.

Career 
Prior to being elected to the Bucks County Board of Commissioners, he was Chief of Staff to State Senator Tommy Tomlinson. In 2000, he ran for a seat in the Pennsylvania House of Representatives in the 141st District. Incumbent Democrat State Representative Anthony Melio won re-election by defeating Cawley 56%–42%. He was also a former Pennsylvania state chairman and national co-chairman of the College Republicans and served as an elected member of the Bristol Township School Board.

He served on the County Commissioner's Association of Pennsylvania's Energy, Environment, & Land Use Committee as Chairman. Jim is a former member of the board of directors for Lower Bucks Hospital, a former trustee of Bucks County Community College and a Commonwealth trustee of Temple University.

Bucks County Commission
He was appointed to the Bucks County Board of Commissioners following the resignation of Mike Fitzpatrick (who had been elected to Congress).

In 2007, he won re-election with 26% of the vote.

He became chairman of the board after he was re-elected. According to self-supplied biographical information, he helped expand the Bucks County Community College, kept taxes low for four consecutive years, and helped increase the county's bond rating to its highest level ever.

Lieutenant governor
In 2010, he ran for the state lieutenant governor and won the Republican primary in a crowded nine candidate field with just 26% of the vote. He only won 14 out of the state's 67 counties. He only won three counties with a majority: Bucks (70%), Montgomery (51%), and Delaware (56%) counties. He was on the ticket with Republican gubernatorial nominee Tom Corbett, the state's Attorney General. He defeated Democrat lieutenant gubernatorial nominee Scott Conklin, a state representative, 54%–46%. He took office on January 18, 2011.

Cawley briefly served as acting governor on February 27, 2014, while Governor Tom Corbett was anesthetized during surgery. The Pennsylvania Constitution states that when the governor is incapacitated, the lieutenant governor shall serve as acting governor until the disability is removed. Corbett awoke after surgery and was cleared to resume power approximately 85 minutes after going under. Cawley was the third lieutenant governor in Pennsylvania history to assume power as acting governor.

Cawley was unopposed in the Republican primary for lieutenant governor in May 2014. He was Governor Corbett's running mate again in the general election on November 4, 2014, in which the Republican ticket was defeated by the Democrats Tom Wolf and Mike Stack.

Cawley was named a 2014 Aspen Institute Rodel Fellow.

Later career
On February 9, 2015, Cawley became the new president and CEO of the United Way of Greater Philadelphia and Southern New Jersey.

On August 13, 2017, Temple announced the appointment of Cawley as a Vice President of Institutional Advancement.

On June 3, 2022, the Board of Trustees of Rosemont College in Rosemont, Pennsylvania announced the appointment of Cawley as Interim President of the College.

On October 28, 2022, the Board of Trustees of Rosemont College announced the appointment of Cawley as President of the College.

Personal life
Cawley, lives in Langhorne Manor Borough, Bucks County, Pennsylvania with his wife and son.

See also

Pennsylvania gubernatorial election, 2018
Pennsylvania gubernatorial election, 2014
Pennsylvania lieutenant gubernatorial election, 2014

References

External links

1969 births
Living people
Lieutenant Governors of Pennsylvania
People from Bristol, Pennsylvania
Pennsylvania Republicans
College Republicans
Temple University alumni
Temple University Beasley School of Law alumni
School board members in Pennsylvania
Bucks County Commissioners (Pennsylvania)